In differential geometry, the Gaussian curvature or Gauss curvature  of a smooth surface in three-dimensional space at a point is the product of the principal curvatures,  and , at the given point:

For example, a sphere of radius  has Gaussian curvature  everywhere, and a flat plane and a cylinder have Gaussian curvature zero everywhere. The Gaussian curvature can also be negative, as in the case of a hyperboloid or the inside of a torus.

Gaussian curvature is an intrinsic measure of curvature, depending only on distances that are measured “within” or along the surface, not on the way it is isometrically embedded in Euclidean space. This is the content of the Theorema egregium.

Gaussian curvature is named after Carl Friedrich Gauss, who published the Theorema egregium in 1827.

Informal definition

At any point on a surface, we can find a normal vector that is at right angles to the surface; planes containing the normal vector are called normal planes. The intersection of a normal plane and the surface will form a curve called a normal section and the curvature of this curve is the normal curvature. For most points on most “smooth” surfaces, different normal sections will have different curvatures; the maximum and minimum values of these are called the principal curvatures, call these , . The Gaussian curvature is the product of the two principal curvatures .

The sign of the Gaussian curvature can be used to characterise the surface.
If both principal curvatures are of the same sign: , then the Gaussian curvature is positive and the surface is said to have an elliptic point. At such points, the surface will be dome like, locally lying on one side of its tangent plane. All sectional curvatures will have the same sign. 
If the principal curvatures have different signs: , then the Gaussian curvature is negative and the surface is said to have a hyperbolic or saddle point. At such points, the surface will be saddle shaped. Because one principal curvature is negative, one is positive, and the normal curvature varies continuously if you rotate a plane orthogonal to the surface around the normal to the surface in two directions, the normal curvatures will be zero giving the asymptotic curves for that point.
If one of the principal curvatures is zero: , the Gaussian curvature is zero and the surface is said to have a parabolic point.

Most surfaces will contain regions of positive Gaussian curvature (elliptical points) and regions of negative Gaussian curvature separated by a curve of points with zero Gaussian curvature called a parabolic line.

Relation to geometries

When a surface has a constant zero Gaussian curvature, then it is a developable surface and the geometry of the surface is Euclidean geometry.

When a surface has a constant positive Gaussian curvature, then the geometry of the surface is spherical geometry. Spheres and patches of spheres have this geometry, but there exist other examples as well, such as the football.

When a surface has a constant negative Gaussian curvature, then it is a pseudospherical surface and the geometry of the surface is hyperbolic geometry.

Relation to principal curvatures
The two principal curvatures at a given point of a surface are the eigenvalues of the shape operator at the point. They measure how the surface bends by different amounts in different directions at that point. We represent the surface by the implicit function theorem as the graph of a function, of two variables, in such a way that the point  is a critical point, that is, the gradient of  vanishes (this can always be attained by a suitable rigid motion). (Recall that the Hessian is the 2×2 matrix of second derivatives.) This definition allows one immediately to grasp the distinction between a cup/cap versus a saddle point.

Alternative definitions
It is also given by

where  is the shape operator.

A useful formula for the Gaussian curvature is Liouville's equation in terms of the Laplacian in isothermal coordinates.

Total curvature

The surface integral of the Gaussian curvature over some region of a surface is called the total curvature. On a surface of zero curvature, such as the Euclidean plane, the angles will sum to precisely  radians.

A more general result is the Gauss–Bonnet theorem.

Important theorems

Theorema egregium

Gauss's Theorema egregium (Latin: "remarkable theorem") states that Gaussian curvature of a surface can be determined from the measurements of length on the surface itself. In fact, it can be found given the full knowledge of the first fundamental form and expressed via the first fundamental form and its partial derivatives of first and second order. Equivalently, the determinant of the second fundamental form of a surface in  can be so expressed. The "remarkable", and surprising, feature of this theorem is that although the definition of the Gaussian curvature of a surface  in  certainly depends on the way in which the surface is located in space, the end result, the Gaussian curvature itself, is determined by the intrinsic metric of the surface without any further reference to the ambient space: it is an intrinsic invariant. In particular, the Gaussian curvature is invariant under isometric deformations of the surface.

In contemporary differential geometry, a "surface", viewed abstractly, is a two-dimensional differentiable manifold. To connect this point of view with the classical theory of surfaces, such an abstract surface is embedded into  and endowed with the Riemannian metric given by the first fundamental form. Theorema egregium is then stated as follows:

For example, the Gaussian curvature of a cylindrical tube is zero, the same as for the "unrolled" tube (which is flat). On the other hand, since a sphere of radius  has constant positive curvature  and a flat plane has constant curvature 0, these two surfaces are not isometric, not even locally. Thus any planar representation of even a small part of a sphere must distort the distances. Therefore, no cartographic projection is perfect.

Gauss–Bonnet theorem

The Gauss–Bonnet theorem links the total curvature of a surface to its Euler characteristic and provides an important link between local geometric properties and global topological properties.

Surfaces of constant curvature 

Minding's theorem (1839) states that all surfaces with the same constant curvature  are locally isometric. A consequence of Minding's theorem is that any surface whose curvature is identically zero can be constructed by bending some plane region. Such surfaces are called developable surfaces. Minding also raised the question of whether a closed surface with constant positive curvature is necessarily rigid.
Liebmann's theorem (1900) answered Minding's question. If a sphere is deformed, it does not remain a sphere, proving that a sphere is rigid. A standard proof uses Hilbert's lemma that non-umbilical points of extreme principal curvature have non-positive Gaussian curvature.
The pseudosphere has constant negative Gaussian curvature except at its singular cusp.

There are other surfaces which have constant positive Gaussian curvature. These surfaces all have constant Gaussian curvature of 1, but, for  either have a boundary or a singular point. do Carmo also gives three different examples of surface with constant negative Gaussian curvature, one of which is pseudosphere. 

There are many other possible bounded surfaces with constant Gaussian curvature. Whilst the sphere is rigid and can not be bent using an isometry, if a small region removed, or even a cut along a small segment, then the resulting surface can be bent. Such bending preserves Gaussian curvature so any such bending of a sphere with a region removed will also have constant Gaussian curvature.

Alternative formulas
Gaussian curvature of a surface in  can be expressed as the ratio of the determinants of the second and first fundamental forms  and : 
The  (after Francesco Brioschi) gives Gaussian curvature solely in terms of the first fundamental form: 
For an orthogonal parametrization, Gaussian curvature is: 
For a surface described as graph of a function , Gaussian curvature is: 
 For an implicitly defined surface, the Gaussian curvature can be expressed in terms of the gradient  and Hessian matrix : 
Gaussian curvature is the limiting difference between the circumference of a geodesic circle and a circle in the plane: 
Gaussian curvature is the limiting difference between the area of a geodesic disk and a disk in the plane: 
Gaussian curvature may be expressed with the Christoffel symbols:

See also
 Earth's Gaussian radius of curvature
 Sectional curvature
 Mean curvature
 Gauss map
 Riemann curvature tensor
 Principal curvature

References

Books

External links
 

Curvature (mathematics)
Differential geometry
Differential geometry of surfaces
Surfaces
Differential topology
Carl Friedrich Gauss